Mini Kiss is a Kiss tribute band made up entirely of little people. The founder was bandleader Joey Fatale (4' 4" – Mini Gen) from New York City, the same place Kiss started.

They made an appearance on the Game Show Network revival of I've Got a Secret and Lip Sync Battle. The band tours regularly playing venues ranging in size from 100 to 1,000 seats. The band made a cameo on the television series Z Rock and also made a cameo on one of the Dr Pepper Cherry TV commercials "A Little Kiss" sharing the stage with the real Kiss. Fatale died on August 7, 2011. Mini Kiss still does tours and shows.

The band also appeared in the film Paul Blart: Mall Cop 2.

External links
 Mini Kiss website

Cultural depictions of Kiss (band)
Tribute bands